Det var paa Rundetaarn is a 1955 Danish comedy film directed by Poul Bang and starring Dirch Passer.

Cast
Dirch Passer as Poul Jensen
Ove Sprogøe as Hans Ramløse
Clara Østø as Fru Hambro
Kjeld Petersen as Landsretsagfører Hartsen
Bodil Steen as Fru Hartsen
Lili Heglund as Fru Holm (Fru Hartsens mor)
Karen Berg as Fru Hald
Anne-Marie Juhl as Johanne Hald
Bodil Miller as Grete Hald
Ole Monty as Privatdetektiv Aage F.I. Duus
Buster Larsen as Lasse Larsen
Sigrid Horne-Rasmussen as Garderobedame
Mogens Brandt as Indehaver af detektivbureau
Asta Esper Hagen Andersen as Dame I finanshovedkassen (as Asta Esper Hagen)
Miskow Makwarth as Grosser Hejresen
Vivi Svendsen as Elisabeth Hejresen
Paul Hagen as Isbilchauffør

External links

1955 films
1955 romantic comedy films
1950s Danish-language films
Danish black-and-white films
Danish romantic comedy films
Films directed by Poul Bang
Films scored by Sven Gyldmark